Philadelphia Wings may refer to any of three distinct professional lacrosse teams:

 Philadelphia Wings (1974–1975), a member of the original National Lacrosse League
 Philadelphia Wings (1987–2014), a founding member of the National Lacrosse League that moved to New England in 2014
 Philadelphia Wings (2018–present), an expansion team in the National Lacrosse League, starting play during the 2018-2019 season.